The 2017 Troy Trojans baseball team represented the Troy University in the 2017 NCAA Division I baseball season. The Trojans played their home games at Riddle–Pace Field.

Schedule and results
Troy announced its 2017 football schedule on October 27, 2016. The 2017 schedule consisted of 28 home and 28 away games in the regular season. The Trojans hosted Sun Belts foes Appalachian State, Georgia Southern, Louisiana–Lafayette, Louisiana–Monroe, and Texas State and will travel to Coastal Carolina, Georgia State, Little Rock, South Alabama, and Texas–Arlington.

The 2017 Sun Belt Conference Championship was contested May 24–28 in Statesboro, Georgia, and was hosted by Georgia Southern.

Troy finished 4th in the east division of the conference which qualified the Trojans to compete in the tournament as the 6th seed seeking for the team's 4th Sun Belt Conference tournament title.

 Rankings are based on the team's current  ranking in the Collegiate Baseball poll.

References

Troy
Troy Trojans baseball seasons